SKF-83,959 is a synthetic benzazepine derivative used in scientific research which acts as an agonist at the D1–D2 dopamine receptor heteromer. It behaves as a full agonist at the D1 protomer and a high-affinity partial agonist at the D2 protomer. It was further shown to act as an allosteric modulator of the sigma-1 receptor. SKF-83,959 additionally inhibits sodium channels as well as delayed rectifier potassium channels. SKF-83,959 is a racemate that consists of the R-(+)- and S-(−)-enantiomers MCL-202 and MCL-201, respectively.

SKF-83,959 was described as a SNDRI. The synthesis has been described:

References

Further reading
 
 

1-Phenyl-2,3,4,5-tetrahydro-1H-3-benzazepines
GSK plc brands
D1-receptor agonists
D2-receptor agonists
Catechols
Chloroarenes
Potassium channel blockers
Receptor heteromer ligands
Sigma receptor ligands
Sodium channel blockers